Miriani Maisuradze (born 7 December 1999) is a Georgian freestyle wrestler. He won one of the bronze medals in the men's 92kg event at the 2022 World Wrestling Championships held in Belgrade, Serbia. He also won one of the bronze medals in the men's 92kg event at the 2022 European Wrestling Championships held in Budapest, Hungary.

He won the gold medal in the men's 92kg at the 2021 Dan Kolov & Nikola Petrov Tournament held in Plovdiv, Bulgaria. In 2022, he competed at the Yasar Dogu Tournament held in Istanbul, Turkey. He won the silver medal in his event at the Matteo Pellicone Ranking Series 2022 held in Rome, Italy.

Achievements

References

External links
 

Living people
1999 births
People from Racha-Lechkhumi and Kvemo Svaneti
Male sport wrestlers from Georgia (country)
World Wrestling Championships medalists
European Wrestling Championships medalists
21st-century people from Georgia (country)